Salvando Al Género is the mixtape by Trebol Clan released in 2008.

Track listing

 Salvando Al Género (Intro)
 Corran  (featuring Franco "El Gorila")
 Explota La Nota
 No Te Enamores (featuring J-King & Maximan)
 Por Amarte Yo (featuring Tito "El Bambino")
 Wow
 Volver a Amar
 No Tienes Por Que Llorar (featuring Jomar)
 Una Noche Más (featuring Joselito)
 Me Seduces (featuring Delirious)
 Corran (Street Version) (featuring Franco "El Gorila" & Fito Blanko)
 Salvando Al Género (DJ Joe Official Mix)

Trébol Clan albums
2008 albums